Cyperus filiformis is a species of sedge that is native to northern parts of South America, southern parts of North America and parts of the Caribbean.

See also 
 List of Cyperus species

References 

filiformis
Plants described in 1788
Taxa named by Olof Swartz
Flora of Florida
Flora of the Bahamas
Flora of Colombia
Flora of Cuba
Flora of the Dominican Republic
Flora of Haiti
Flora of Jamaica
Flora of the Netherlands Antilles
Flora of Venezuela
Flora without expected TNC conservation status